Krzysztof Karpiński (16 October 1953 – 28 July 2021) was a Polish professional footballer who played as a defender for Śląsk Wrocław.

References

1953 births
2021 deaths
Polish footballers
Śląsk Wrocław players
Ekstraklasa players
Association football defenders
Sportspeople from Kalisz